Today's Airbus SE is the product of international consolidation in the European aerospace industry tracing back to the formation of the Airbus Industrie GIE consortium in 1970. In 2000, the European Aeronautic Defence and Space Company (EADS) NV was established. In addition to other subsidiaries pertaining to security and space activities, EADS owned 100% of the pre-existing Eurocopter SA, established in 1992, as well as 80% of Airbus Industrie GIE. In 2001, Airbus Industrie GIE was reorganised as Airbus SAS, a simplified joint-stock company. In 2006, EADS acquired the remaining 20% shares of Airbus Industrie GIE from BAE Systems. EADS NV was renamed Airbus Group NV and SE in 2014, and 2015, respectively. Due to the commercial aircraft division's prominence within Airbus SE with it representing the largest part of the corporation's activities, Airbus S.A.S was simply merged into the parent company in January 2017. Airbus SE itself therefore became the commercial aircraft division, while also being the parent company of the other two divisions Airbus Defence and Space and Airbus Helicopters. The company was given its present name in April 2017.

Timeline

Background

1970–2000: Airbus Industrie GIE
Airbus Industrie began as a consortium of European aviation firms formed to compete with American companies such as Boeing, McDonnell Douglas, and Lockheed.

While many European aircraft were innovative, even the most successful had small production runs. Factors favouring American aircraft manufacturers included: the size of the United States which made air transport popular; a 1942 Anglo-American agreement entrusting transport aircraft production to the US; and the World War II legacy of "a profitable, vigorous, powerful and structured aeronautical industry" in America.

 By the mid-1960s, several European aircraft manufacturers had drawn up competitive designs, but were aware of the risks of such a project. For example, in 1959 Hawker Siddeley had advertised an "Airbus" version of the Armstrong Whitworth AW.660 Argosy, which would "be able to lift as many as 126 passengers on ultra short routes at a direct operating cost of 2d. per seat mile".

The European industry began to accept, along with their governments, that collaboration was required to develop such an aircraft and to compete with the more powerful US manufacturers. Negotiations began over a European collaborative approach and at the 1965 Paris Air Show the major European airlines informally discussed their requirements for a new "Airbus" capable of transporting 100 or more passengers over short to medium distances at a low cost. The same year Hawker Siddeley (at the urging of the UK government) teamed with Breguet and Nord to study Airbus designs. The Hawker Siddeley/Breguet/Nord group's HBN 100 became the basis for the continuation of the project. By 1966 the partners were Sud Aviation, later Aérospatiale (France), Arbeitsgemeinschaft Airbus, later Deutsche Airbus (West Germany) and Hawker Siddeley (UK). A request for funding was made to the three governments in October 1966. On 25 July 1967, the three governments agreed to proceed with the proposal.

In the two years following this agreement, both the British and French governments expressed doubts about the project. The memorandum of understanding had stated that 75 orders must be achieved by 31 July 1968. The French government threatened to withdraw from the project due to its concern over funding all of the Airbus A300, Concorde and the Dassault Mercure concurrently, but was persuaded by Ziegler to maintain its support. With its own concerns at the A300B proposal in December 1968, and fearing it would not recoup its investment due to lack of sales, the British government withdrew on 10 April 1969. West Germany took this opportunity to increase its share of the project to 50%. Given the participation by Hawker Siddeley up to that point, France and West Germany were reluctant to take over its wing design. Thus the British company was allowed to continue as a privileged subcontractor. Hawker Siddeley invested GB£35 million in tooling and, requiring more capital, received a GB£35 million loan from the West German government.

Airbus Industrie was formally established as a Groupement d'Intérêt Économique (Economic Interest Group or GIE) on 18 December 1970. It had been formed by a government initiative between France, West Germany and the UK that originated in 1967. Its initial shareholders were the French company Aérospatiale and the West German company Deutsche Airbus, each owning a 50% share. The name "Airbus" was taken from a non-proprietary term used by the airline industry in the 1960s to refer to a commercial aircraft of a certain size and range, as it was linguistically-acceptable to the French. Aérospatiale and Deutsche Airbus each took a 36.5% share of production work, Hawker Siddeley 20% and the Dutch company Fokker-VFW 7%. Each company would deliver its sections as fully equipped, ready-to-fly items. In October 1971 the Spanish company CASA acquired a 4.2% share of Airbus Industrie, with Aérospatiale and Deutsche Airbus reducing their total stakes to 47.9%. In January 1979 British Aerospace, which had absorbed Hawker Siddeley in 1977, acquired a 20% share of Airbus Industrie. The majority shareholders reduced their shares to 37.9%, while CASA retained its 4.2%.

The Airbus A300 was to be the first aircraft to be developed, manufactured and marketed by Airbus. By early 1967 the "A300" label began to be applied to a proposed 320 seat, twin engined airliner. Following the 1967 tri-government agreement, Roger Béteille was appointed technical director of the A300 development project. Béteille developed a division of labour that would be the basis of Airbus' production for years to come: France would manufacture the cockpit, flight control and the lower centre section of the fuselage; Hawker Siddeley, whose Trident technology had impressed him, was to manufacture the wings; West Germany should make the forward and rear fuselage sections, as well as the upper centre section; the Dutch would make the flaps and spoilers; finally Spain (yet to become a full partner) would make the horizontal tailplane. On 26 September 1967 the West German, French and British governments signed a Memorandum of Understanding in London which allowed continued development studies. This also confirmed Sud Aviation as the "lead company", that France and the UK would each have a 37.5% work share with West Germany taking 25%, and that Rolls-Royce would manufacture the engines.

In the face of lukewarm support from airlines for a 300+ seat Airbus A300, the partners submitted the A250 proposal, later becoming the A300B, a 250-seat airliner powered by pre-existing engines. This dramatically reduced development costs, as the Rolls-Royce RB207 to be used in the A300 represented a large proportion of the costs. The RB207 had also suffered difficulties and delays, since Rolls-Royce was concentrating its efforts on the development of another jet engine, the RB211, for the Lockheed L-1011 and Rolls-Royce entering into administration due to bankruptcy in 1971. The A300B was smaller but lighter and more economical than its three-engined American rivals.

In 1972, the A300 made its maiden flight; its first production model, the A300B2, entered service in 1974. However, the launch of the A300 was largely overshadowed by the similarly timed supersonic aircraft Concorde. Initially the success of the consortium was poor, but orders for the aircraft picked up, due in part to the marketing skills used by Airbus CEO Bernard Lathière, targeting airlines in America and Asia. By 1979 the consortium had 256 orders for A300, and Airbus had launched a more advanced aircraft, the A310, in the previous year. It was the launch of the A320 in 1987 that guaranteed the status of Airbus as a major player in the aircraft market – the aircraft had over 400 orders before it first flew, compared to 15 for the A300 in 1972.

1992–2000: Eurocopter SA
The Eurocopter SA was formed in 1992, through the merger of the helicopter divisions of Aérospatiale and DASA.  The company's heritage traces back to Blériot and Lioré et Olivier in France and to Messerschmitt and Focke-Wulf in Germany.

2000–2014: European Aeronautic Defence and Space Company NV

In June 1997, British Aerospace Defence Managing Director John Weston commented "Europe ... is supporting three times the number of contractors on less than half the budget of the U.S." European governments wished to see the merger of their defence manufacturers into a single entity, a European Aerospace and Defence Company.

As early as 1995 the German aerospace and defence company DaimlerChrysler Aerospace (DASA) and its British counterpart British Aerospace were said to be eager to create a transnational aerospace and defence company. The two companies envisaged including the French company Aérospatiale, the other major European aerospace company, but only after its privatisation. The first stage of this integration was seen as the transformation of Airbus from a consortium of British Aerospace, DASA, Aérospatiale and Construcciones Aeronáuticas into an integrated company; in this aim BAe and DASA were united against the various objections of Aérospatiale. As well as Airbus, British Aerospace and DASA were partners in the Panavia Tornado and Eurofighter Typhoon aircraft projects.

Merger discussions began between British Aerospace and DASA in July 1998, just as French participation became more likely with the announcement that Aérospatiale was to merge with Matra and emerge with a diluted French government shareholding. A merger was agreed between British Aerospace Chairman Richard Evans and DASA CEO Jürgen Schrempp in December 1998. However, when the British General Electric Company put its defence electronics business Marconi Electronic Systems (MES) up for sale on 22 December 1998, British Aerospace abandoned the DASA merger in favour of purchasing its British rival. (The merger of British Aerospace and MES to form BAE Systems was announced on 19 January 1999 and completed on 30 November; Evans stated in 2004 that his fear was that an American defence contractor would acquire MES and challenge both British Aerospace and DASA).

DASA and the Spanish aircraft company Construcciones Aeronáuticas agreed to merge, signing a memorandum of understanding on 11 June 1999. On 14 October 1999, DASA agreed to merge with Aérospatiale-Matra to create the European Aeronautic Defence and Space Company. 10 July 2000 was "day one" for the new company, which became the world's second-largest aerospace company after Boeing and the second-largest European arms manufacturer after BAE Systems.

In January 2001 Airbus Industrie was transformed from an inherently inefficient consortium structure to a formal joint stock company, with legal and tax procedures being finalised on 11 July. Both EADS and BAE transferred ownership of their Airbus factories to the new Airbus SAS in return for 80% and 20% shares in the new company respectively. In April 2001, EADS agreed to merge its missile businesses with those of BAE Systems and Alenia Marconi Systems (BAE/Finmeccanica) to form MBDA. EADS took a 37.5 % share of the new company that was formally established in December 2001 and which thus became the world's second-largest missile manufacturer.

On 16 June 2003 EADS acquired BAE's 25 % share in Astrium, the satellite and space system manufacturer, to become the sole owner. EADS paid £84 million, however due to the lossmaking status of the company BAE invested an equal amount for "restructuring". It was subsequently renamed EADS Astrium, and had the divisions Astrium Satellites, Astrium Space Transportation and Astrium Services.

In November 2003, EADS announced that it was considering working with Japanese companies, and the Japanese METI, to develop a hypersonic airliner intended to be a larger, faster, and quieter, replacement for the Concorde, which was retired in October the same year.

Despite repeated suggestions as early as 2000 that BAE Systems wished to sell its 20 % share of Airbus, the possibility was consistently denied by the company. However, on 6 April 2006 BBC News reported that it was indeed to sell its stake, then "conservatively valued" at £2.4 billion. Due to the slow pace of informal negotiations, BAE exercised its put option, which saw investment bank Rothschild appointed to give an independent valuation. Six days after this process began, Airbus announced delays to the A380 with significant effects on the value of Airbus shares. On 2 June 2006 Rothschild valued BAE's share at £1.87 billion, well below BAE's, analysts' and even EADS' expectations. The BAE board recommended that the company proceed with the sale and on 4 October 2006 shareholders voted in favour; the sale was completed on 13 October making EADS the sole shareholder of Airbus.

In March 2007, EADS Defence and Security Systems division was awarded an eight-year, £200m contract to provide the IT infrastructure for the FiReControl project in the UK.

The retention of production and engineering assets by the partner companies in effect made Airbus Industrie a sales and marketing company. This arrangement led to inefficiencies due to the inherent conflicts of interest that the four partner companies faced; they were both shareholders of, and subcontractors to, the consortium. The companies collaborated on development of the Airbus range, but guarded the financial details of their own production activities and sought to maximise the transfer prices of their sub-assemblies.

It was becoming clear that Airbus was no longer a temporary collaboration to produce a single plane as per its original mission statement; it had become a long-term brand for the development of further aircraft. By the late 1980s, work had begun on a pair of new medium-sized aircraft, the biggest to be produced at this point under the Airbus name, the Airbus A330 and the Airbus A340.

In the early 1990s the then Airbus CEO Jean Pierson argued that the GIE should be abandoned and Airbus established as a conventional company. However, the difficulties of integrating and valuing the assets of four companies, as well as legal issues, delayed the initiative. In December 1998, when it was reported that British Aerospace and DASA were close to merging, Aérospatiale paralysed negotiations on the Airbus conversion; the French company feared the combined BAe/DASA, which would own 57.9% of Airbus, would dominate the company and it insisted on a 50/50 split. However, the issue was resolved in January 1999 when BAe abandoned talks with DASA in favour of merging with Marconi Electronic Systems to become BAE Systems. Then in 2000, three of the four partner companies (DaimlerChrysler Aerospace, successor to Deutsche Airbus; Aérospatiale-Matra, successor to Sud-Aviation; and CASA) merged to form EADS, simplifying the process. EADS now owned Airbus France, Airbus Deutschland and Airbus España, and thus 80% of Airbus Industrie. BAE Systems and EADS transferred their production assets to the new company, Airbus SAS, in return for shareholdings in that company.

In mid-1988 a group of Airbus engineers led by Jean Roeder began working in secret on the development of an ultra-high-capacity airliner (UHCA), both to complete its own range of products and to break the dominance that Boeing had enjoyed in this market segment since the early 1970s with its 747. The project was announced at the 1990 Farnborough Air Show, with the stated goal of 15% lower operating costs than the 747-400. Airbus organised four teams of designers, one from each of its partners (Aérospatiale, DaimlerChrysler Aerospace, British Aerospace, CASA) to propose new technologies for its future aircraft designs. In June 1994 Airbus began developing its own very large airliner, then designated as A3XX. Airbus considered several designs, including an odd side-by-side combination of two fuselages from the Airbus A340, which was Airbus's largest jet at the time. Airbus refined its design, targeting a 15% to 20% reduction in operating costs over the existing Boeing 747-400. The A3XX design converged on a double-decker layout that provided more passenger volume than a traditional single-deck design.

Five A380s were built for testing and demonstration purposes. The first A380 was unveiled at a ceremony in Toulouse on 18 January 2005, and its maiden flight took place on 27 April 2005. After successfully landing three hours and 54 minutes later, chief test pilot Jacques Rosay said flying the A380 had been "like handling a bicycle". On 1 December 2005, the A380 achieved its maximum design speed of Mach 0.96. On 10 January 2006, the A380 made its first transatlantic flight to Medellín in Colombia.

The Airbus A380 was delayed in October 2006 due to the use of incompatible software used to design the aircraft. Primarily, the Toulouse assembly plant used the latest version 5 of CATIA (made by Dassault), while the design centre at the Hamburg factory were using the older and incompatible version 4. The result was that the 530 km of cables wiring throughout the aircraft had to be completely redesigned. Although no orders had been cancelled, Airbus still had to pay millions in late-delivery penalties.

The first aircraft delivered was to Singapore Airlines on 15 October 2007 and entered service on 25 October 2007 with an inaugural flight between Singapore and Sydney. Two months later Singapore Airlines CEO Chew Choong Seng said that the A380 was performing better than both the airline and Airbus had anticipated, burning 20% less fuel per passenger than the airline's existing 747-400 fleet.  Emirates was the second airline to take delivery of the A380 on 28 July 2008 and started flights between Dubai and New York on 1 August 2008.  Qantas followed on 19 September 2008, starting flights between Melbourne and Los Angeles on 20 October 2008.

In 2003, Airbus and the Kaskol Group created an Airbus Engineering centre in Russia, which started with 30 engineers and since has emerged as a model of success for Airbus' globalisation strategy. It was the first engineering facility to open in Europe outside the company's home countries. Equipped with state-of-the-art communications equipment and linked with Airbus engineering sites in France and Germany, the facility performs extensive work in disciplines such as fuselage structure, stress, system installation and design. In 2011, the centre employs some 200 engineers who have completed over 30 large-scale projects for the A320, the A330/A340 and the A380 programmes. Russian engineers also performed more than half of all design work on the A330-200F freighter, with its activity related to fuselage structure design, floor grids installation and junctions design. The centre currently is involved in the A320neo Sharklets design development and numerous design works for the A350 XWB programme.

On 6 April 2006 BAE Systems planned to sell its 20% share in Airbus, then "conservatively valued" at €3.5 billion (US$4.17 billion). Analysts suggested the move to make partnerships with U.S. firms more feasible, in both financial and political terms. BAE originally sought to agree on a price with EADS through an informal process. Due to lengthy negotiations and disagreements over price, BAE exercised its put option, which saw investment bank Rothschild appointed to give an independent valuation.

In June 2006 Airbus was embroiled in significant international controversy over an announcement of further delays in the delivery of its A380. Following the announcement the value of associated stock plunged by up to 25% in a matter of days, although it soon recovered afterwards. Allegations of insider trading on the part of Noël Forgeard, CEO of EADS, its majority corporate parent, promptly followed. The loss of associated value was of grave concern to BAE, press described a "furious row" between BAE and EADS, with BAE believing the announcement was designed to depress the value of its share. A French shareholder group filed a class action lawsuit against EADS for failing to inform investors of the financial implications of the A380 delays while airlines awaiting deliveries demanded compensation. As a result, EADS chief Noël Forgeard and Airbus CEO Gustav Humbert resigned on 2 July 2006.

On 2 July 2006 Rothschild valued BAE's stake at £1.9 billion (€2.75 billion), well below the expectation of BAE, analysts, and even EADS. On 5 July BAE appointed independent auditors to investigate how the value of its share of Airbus had fallen from the original estimates to the Rothschild valuation; however in September 2006 BAE agreed to the sale of its stake in Airbus to EADS for £1.87 billion (€2.75 billion, $3.53 billion), pending BAE shareholder approval. On 4 October shareholders voted in favour of the sale, leaving Airbus entirely owned by EADS.

On 9 October 2006 Christian Streiff, Humbert's successor, resigned due to differences with parent company EADS over the amount of independence he would be granted in implementing his reorganisation plan for Airbus. He was succeeded by EADS co-CEO Louis Gallois, bringing Airbus under more direct control of its parent company.

On 28 February 2007, CEO Louis Gallois announced the company's restructuring plans. Entitled Power8, the plan would see 10,000 jobs cut over four years; 4,300 in France, 3,700 in Germany, 1,600 in the UK and 400 in Spain. 5,000 of the 10,000 would be at subcontractors. Plants at Saint Nazaire, Varel and Laupheim face sell off or closure, while Meaulte, Nordenham and Filton are "open to investors". As of 16 September 2008 the Laupheim plant has been sold to a Thales-Diehl consortium to form Diehl Aerospace and while the design activities at Filton have been retained, the manufacturing operations have been sold to British company GKN. The announcements resulted in Airbus unions in France and Germany threatening strike action.

At the 2011 Paris Air Show, Airbus received total orders valued at about $72.2 billion for 730 aircraft, a new record in the civil aviation industry. The A320neo ("new engine option") model, announced in December 2010, received 667 orders; this, together with previous orders, resulted in a total of 1029 orders within six months of launch date, creating another industry record.

In February 2008, the United States Air Force awarded a $35 billion contract for KC-45 aerial refueling tankers to Northrop Grumman, with EADS as a major subcontractor. The contract, initially valued at $35 billion, would have seen Northrop Grumman and EADS would build a fleet of 179 planes based on the existing Airbus A330 to provide in-air refueling to military aircraft. Final assembly of the aircraft would take place at an Airbus plant near Mobile, Alabama. However the award was protested by Boeing, the other bidder on the project, which was upheld by the GAO. The competition was restarted and in March 2010, Northrop Grumman announced it was withdrawing its bid, with its CEO stating that the revised tender requirement favored Boeing. On 20 April 2010, EADS announced it was re-entering the competition and intended to enter a bid with the KC-45.

EADS reported a 763 million euros loss for 2009 as a result of a 1.8 billion euros charge on the troubled Airbus A400M project and a 240 million euros charge related to the A380.

In September 2012 it was reported that BAE and EADS were in merger discussions. In the event of a merger, BAE shareholders would own 40 % and EADS 60 % of the resultant organisation. EADS shareholder Lagardere asked EADS to rethink the proposed merger as the conditions were unsatisfactory. The bosses of BAE Systems and EADS issued a joint statement seeking political support for their proposed 35 billion euro (US$45 billion) merger from the British, French and German governments; and reiterated that the combination is borne out of opportunity, not necessity and the new company would be greater than the sum of its parts. On 10 October 2012, the merger proposal was abandoned.

2014–2015: Airbus Group NV
In January 2014, EADS was reorganised as Airbus Group NV, with three divisions (Airbus, Airbus Defence and Space, and Airbus Helicopters. On 27 May 2015 the company became a Societas Europaea (SE) (Latin: European Company), having been a Naamloze vennootschap (public limited company). In September 2016, Airbus Group announced that it would merge with its largest division, Airbus SAS, into a new entity and introduce a single Airbus brand, the merge to take effect on 1 January 2017. The group reorganized under the brand name of "Airbus" in January 2017. The subsidiaries Airbus Helicopters and Airbus Defence and Space became operating divisions of the same company. Airbus Group SE changed its legal name to Airbus SE at its 2017 annual meeting on 12 April 2017.

2015–2017: Airbus Group SE
In 2015, Airbus Group said it was establishing an R&D center and venture capital fund in Silicon Valley. Airbus CEO Fabrice Bregier stated: "What is the weakness of a big group like Airbus when we talk about innovation? We believe that we have better ideas than the rest of the world. We believe that we know because we control the technologies and platforms. The world has shown us in the car industry, the space industry and the hi-tech industry that this is not true. And we need to be open to others' ideas and others' innovations".

Airbus Group CEO Tom Enders stated that "The only way to do it for big companies is really to create spaces outside of the main business where we allow and where we incentivize experimentation ... That is what we have started to do but there is no manual ... It is a little bit of trial and error. We all feel challenged by what the Internet companies are doing."

Six months after launch, the Airbus Group Venture fund in Silicon Valley became fully operational in January 2016.

In January 2016 Airbus announced it has signed a tentative agreement with Iran to sell 118 Airbus aircraft along with a comprehensive civil aviation cooperation package as a part of the implementation of the Joint Comprehensive Plan of Action (JCPOA). Boeing has also announced its will to sell 80 jets directly to Iran Air as part of a proposed deal worth up to $17.6bn.

However, In early July 2016, US House of Representatives passed amendments that would block US Department of Treasury funds from granting export licences or reexport of passenger commercial aircraft. Boeing reacted that if its deal with Iran is blocked by the US Congress, all other companies that supply to its rivals should be prohibited as well. Airbus, too, has said that it requires US's approval to export airliners to Iran, because parts of its aircraft are made in the US.

The deal between Iran Air and Airbus was finally implemented, and the first new purchased Airbus aircraft, an A321, landed in Tehran's International Mehr Abad Airport on January 12, 2017; Airbus stated that the delivery has been in full compliance with the JCPOA and US government Office of Foreign Assets Control licenses.

2017–present: Airbus SE
On 30 June, Airbus said its airliner sales team would now report directly to Tom Enders, Airbus Chief Executive, and by-pass Fabrice Bregier, who will lead programs, support and services, engineering, manufacturing, procurement and quality while Enders will lead sales and marketing.

On 16 October, Airbus and Bombardier Aerospace announced a partnership on the CSeries program, with Airbus acquiring a 50.01% majority stake, to expand in an estimated market of more than 6,000 new 100-150 seat aircraft over 20 years; Airbus' supply chain expertise should save production costs but headquarters and assembly remain in Québec while U.S. customers would benefit from a second Final Assembly Line in Mobile, Alabama.

In the fall, Der Spiegel investigated systematic corruption and improper intermediates usage in past sales and questioned whether Enders can survive the scandal as he did not react quickly enough, then Handelsblatt reported the French government wants to control Airbus again and Bregier wants to get Enders fired to gain his position.

Sales chief John Leahy was supposed to retire at the end of 2017 to be replaced by his deputy Kiran Rao.
A few weeks before the switch, Rao told Airbus CEO Tom Enders that he was no longer available.
After investigations into alleged bribery, Enders took personal responsibility for the sales organization compliance. Eric Schulz, aerospace engineer and president of Rolls-Royce plc Civil Aerospace, replaced Leahy in January 2018.

In November, Paul Eremenko, Airbus's CTO, quit after two years. French unions held him responsible for the job cuts made at a French research facility nearby Paris. Tom Enders was counting on Paul Eremenko to create a radically different approach to R&D.

On 28 November 2017, Airbus announced a partnership with Rolls-Royce plc and Siemens to develop the E-Fan X hybrid-electric aircraft demonstrator, to fly in 2020.

Enders' mandate as CEO ran until April 2019, but in December 2017 the Airbus board confirmed Enders will not stay beyond April 2019 and announced that in February 2018 Brégier will be replaced by Guillaume Faury, currently Airbus Helicopters CEO.  This should have been disclosed in early 2018, however the media hype accelerated the timing but not the decision.
When told by the board that he would not succeed Enders as CEO, Bregier chose to leave.
Besides Enders, Bregier, Leahy and Eremenko, engineering chief Charles Champion is retiring at the end of 2017, Airbus North America chairman Allan McArtor is leaving, as is the unit's CEO Barry Eccleston to be replaced by Jeff Knittel, CEO of lessor CIT Aerospace.
Head of military aircraft Fernando Alonso, civil aircraft division COO Tom Williams and head of programs Didier Evrard are also nearing retirement.

For 2017, Airbus announced it received 1,109 net orders from 44 customers in 2017, and delivered 718 aircraft to 85 customers: 558 A320 Family (including 181 A320neo); 67 A330s; 78 A350 XWBs and 15 A380s.

Following the UK decision to leave the EU, Airbus faced calls to move or reduce wing production from the UK.
Currently produced in Broughton and designed in Filton since 1970, wing production employs 15,000 people, which is over 10% of Airbus staff. However Tom Enders promised the UK government that Airbus would retain its British operations "long into the future" and see the UK as a "home country and a competitive place to invest".
Airbus will designate a new CEO to succeed Enders by the end of 2018, which will be submitted to shareholders at the spring 2019 annual meeting, with planemaking boss and former Eurocopter head  Guillaume Faury as the main internal candidate.
Airbus chief financial officer Harald Wilhelm will quit when Enders will leave in 2019.

On 15 May, in its EU appeal ruling, the WTO concluded that the A380 and A350 received improper subsidies through repayable launch aids or low interest rates which could have been avoided, and Airbus agreed to correct those violations.

On 13 September, Eric Schulz left the Chief Commercial Officer role for personal reasons and was replaced by Christian Scherer, CEO of ATR since October 2016.
As Schulz was previously head of Rolls-Royce plc civil engines, currently suffering problems, airlines could have had a skewed opinion.

On 8 October, the Board of directors selected Guillaume Faury to succeed Tom Enders as Airbus CEO from 10 April 2019.
On 21 November, Airbus appointed Michael Schöllhorn, COO for BSH Home Appliances GmbH, to succeed Tom Williams as Chief Operating Officer (COO) for Airbus Commercial Aircraft from 1 February 2019,
and Dominik Asam, CFO of Infineon Technologies, to succeed Harald Wilhelm as Chief Financial Officer from 10 April 2019.
On 20 December 2018, Le Monde newspaper reported the U.S. Department of Justice had opened a corruption investigation, which could result in fines of up to 4-5 billion Euros.

In February 2019, Airbus launched The OneAtlas Platform, a geospatial tool that applies artificial intelligence to satellite images and extracts insights for customers.

Competition with Boeing

Airbus is in tight competition with Boeing every year for aircraft orders although Airbus has secured over 50% of aircraft orders in the decade since 2003.

Airbus won a greater share of orders in 2003 and 2004. In 2005, Airbus achieved 1111 (1055 net) orders, compared to 1029 (net of 1002) for the same year at rival Boeing However, Boeing won 55% of 2005 orders proportioned by value; and in the following year Boeing won more orders by both measures. Airbus in 2006 achieved its second best year ever in its entire 35-year history in terms of the number of orders it received, 824, second only to the previous year. Airbus plans to increase production of A320 airliners to reach 40 per month by 2012, at a time when Boeing is increasing monthly 737 production from 31.5 to 35 per month.

Regarding operational aircraft, there were 7,264 Airbus aircraft operational at April 2013.  Although Airbus secured over 50% of aircraft orders in the decade since 2003, the number of Boeing aircraft still in operation at April 2013 still exceeded Airbus by 21% because Airbus made a late entry into the market, 1972 vs. 1958 for Boeing; this lead is diminishing as older aircraft are progressively retired.

Though both manufacturers have a broad product range in various segments from single-aisle to wide-body, their aircraft do not always compete head-to-head. Instead they respond with models slightly smaller or bigger than the other in order to plug any holes in demand and achieve a better edge. The A380, for example, is designed to be larger than the 747. The A350XWB competes with the high end of the 787 and the low end of the 777. The A320 is bigger than the 737-700 but smaller than the 737-800. The A321 is bigger than the 737-900 but smaller than the previous 757-200. Airlines see this as a benefit since they get a more complete product range, from 100 seats to 500 seats, than if both companies offered identical aircraft.

In recent years the Boeing 777 has outsold its Airbus counterparts, which include the A340 family as well as the A330-300. The smaller A330-200 competes with the 767, outselling its Boeing counterpart in recent years. The A380 is anticipated to further reduce sales of the Boeing 747, gaining Airbus a share of the market in very large aircraft, though frequent delays in the A380 programme have caused several customers to consider the refreshed 747–8. Airbus has also proposed the A350 XWB to compete with the  Boeing 787 Dreamliner, after being under great pressure from airlines to produce a competing model.

The A320neo's primary competitor is Boeing 737 MAX which was grounded in March 2019 after two fatal accidents.

Historical emblems
Emblems of Airbus Industrie GIE (1970–2000) and Airbus SAS (2001–2016), until the latter on 1 January 2017 merged with its parent company, Airbus Group SE:

Emblems of the European Aeronautic Defence and Space Company NV (2000–2014), Airbus Group NV (2014–2015) and Airbus Group SE (2015–2017):

See also

Competition between Airbus and Boeing
Concorde aircraft histories
History of aviation
Aviation in the Digital Age

References

Further reading

Videos

External links
 
 
 
 
 

Airbus
Airbus
Airbus